Łukasz Merda (born 4 May 1980) is a Polish former professional footballer who played as a goalkeeper.

Club career
Born in Międzyrzecz, Merda spent the vast majority of his career in his country's lower leagues, starting out at Miejski Klub Sportowy Pogoń Świebodzin. In the summer of 2009, he joined Ekstraklasa club KS Cracovia on a four-year contract.

During his two-year spell in Kraków, Merda only managed to appear in 13 competitive matches. His debut in the top flight arrived on 19 September 2009, in a 0–2 away defeat against Ruch Chorzów.

References

External links

1980 births
Living people
People from Międzyrzecz
Sportspeople from Lubusz Voivodeship
Polish footballers
Association football goalkeepers
Ekstraklasa players
I liga players
Podbeskidzie Bielsko-Biała players
MKS Cracovia (football) players